Albion SC may refer to:

 Albion SC San Diego, an American soccer team
 Albion SC Delaware, an American soccer team
 Albion SC Las Vegas, an American soccer team